A cellular microarray (or cell microarray) is a laboratory tool that allows for the multiplex interrogation of living cells on the surface of a solid support.  The support, sometimes called a "chip", is spotted with varying materials, such as antibodies, proteins, or lipids, which can interact with the cells, leading to their capture on specific spots.  Combinations of different materials can be spotted in a given area, allowing not only cellular capture, when a specific interaction exists, but also the triggering of a cellular response, change in phenotype, or detection of a response from the cell, such as a specific secreted factor.

There are a large number of types of cellular microarrays:

 Reverse transfection cell microarrays. David M. Sabatini's laboratory developed reverse-transfection cell microarrays at the Whitehead Institute, publishing their work in 2001.
 PMHC Cellular Microarrays.  This type of microarray were developed by Daniel Chen, Yoav Soen, Dan Kraft, Patrick Brown and Mark Davis at Stanford University Medical Center.

References
 Chen DS, Davis MM (2006) Molecular and functional analysis using live cell microarrays. Curr Opin Chem Biol 10:28-34
 Chen DS, Soen Y, Stuge TB, Lee PP, Weber JS, Brown PO, Davis MM (2005) Marked Differences in Human Melanoma Antigen-Specific T Cell Responsiveness after Vaccination Using a Functional Microarray. PLoS Med 2: 10: e265 
 Soen Y., Chen D. S., Kraft D. L., Davis M. M. and Brown P.O. (2003) Detection and characterization of cellular immune responses using peptide-MHC microarrays. PLoS Biol. 1: E65 (http://biology.plosjournals.org/perlserv/?request=get-document&doi=10.1371/journal.pbio.0000065) 
 Chen DS, Davis MM (2005) Cellular immunotherapy: Antigen recognition is just the beginning. Springer Semin Immunopathol 27:119–127
 Chen DS, Soen Y, Davis MM, Brown PO (2004) Functional and molecular profiling of heterogeneous tumor samples using a novel cellular microarray. J Clin Oncol 22:9507 (https://web.archive.org/web/20041020122342/http://meeting.jco.org/cgi/content/abstract/22/14_suppl/9507)
 Soen Y, Chen DS, Stuge TB, Weber JS, Lee PP, et al. (2004) A novel cellular microarray identifies functional deficiences in tumor-specific T cell responses. J Clin Oncol 22:2510
 Ziauddin J, Sabatini DM (2001) Microarrays of cells expressing defined cDNAs. Nature. 2001 May 3;411(6833):107-10. Pubmed link

Biotechnology